Jamerson Santos de Jesus  (born 9 September 1998), known as Jamerson Bahia or just Jamerson, is a Brazilian professional footballer who plays as a left back for Guarani.

Personal life
Jamerson was born in Salvador, Bahia, and lived with his mother Luciana, his younger brother Leonardo, his grandmother Conceição and his uncle Lionel. He lost his mother and his uncle when travelling to seek an opportunity, with his grandmother and his brother also passing away later on.

Club career
Jamerson had a failed trial at Avaí at the age of 15 before moving to Brasília, where he was also unable to join a club. His first club was Marília in 2017, as he played for the under-20s before being promoted to the first team in the following year.

After being a regular starter in the 2018 Campeonato Paulista Série A3, Jamerson moved abroad and joined Portimonense in Portugal, being initially assigned to the under-23 team.

Jamerson started the 2021–22 season at Sertanense, before returning to his home country in February 2022 with Azuriz. On 20 July, he moved to Série B side Guarani on loan until the end of the year.

On 10 November 2022, after being the assist leader of the 2022 Série B, Jamerson signed a permanent deal with Bugre, as the club bought 50% of his economic rights for a rumoured fee of R$ 400,000.

Career statistics

References

1999 births
Living people
Sportspeople from Salvador, Bahia
Brazilian footballers
Association football defenders
Campeonato Brasileiro Série B players
Campeonato Brasileiro Série D players
Marília Atlético Clube players
Azuriz Futebol Clube players
Guarani FC players
Campeonato de Portugal (league) players
Portimonense S.C. players
Sertanense F.C. players
Brazilian expatriate footballers
Brazilian expatriate sportspeople in Portugal
Expatriate footballers in Portugal